Čkyně is a municipality and village in Prachatice District in the South Bohemian Region of the Czech Republic. It has about 1,600 inhabitants.

Administrative parts
Villages of Dolany, Horosedly, Onšovice, Předenice, Spůle and Záhoříčko are administrative parts of Čkyně.

References

Villages in Prachatice District
Bohemian Forest